Antennaria virginica  is a North American species of flowering plants in the family Asteraceae known by the common names shalebarren pussytoes. It grows on Devonian shale in the eastern United States. It is found in central Appalachian Mountains of Pennsylvania, Maryland, West Virginia, and Virginia, with a few populations in eastern Ohio.

Antennaria virginica  grows up to 25 cm (10 inches) tall, spreading by horizontal stems that run along the surface of the ground. Male and female flower heads are borne on separate plants. One plant can have several heads in a flat-topped array.

References

Plants described in 1935
Flora of the Eastern United States
virginica